Chalcides coeruleopunctatus is a species of lizard in the family Scincidae. The species is found in the Canary Islands.

References

Chalcides
Skinks of Africa
Reptiles described in 1975
Taxa named by Alfredo Salvador (herpetologist)
Reptiles of the Canary Islands